The Olifantsvlei Nature Reserve is a large section of protected land in Johannesburg South. Inside it is the Olifantsvlei Cemetery, Johannesburg Water's Olifantsvlei Wastewater Treatment Works and Bushkoppies Wastewater Treatment Works. A wetland, part of the Klip River, runs along its southern border. The reserve lies adjacent to Lenasia, alongside the R554. The Golden Highway (R553) and N1 roads vertically divide it into three parts. On its northern border, it lies beneath the towns of Eldorado Park, Nancefield, Devland and Naturena, from west to east. Nearby is the Klipriviersberg Nature Reserve.

Biodiversity 
The marshland, mainly consisting of Phragmites reed beds host a number of species:

Birds 

 Common reed warbler
 Baillon's crake
 Black crake
 Common moorhen
 Flufftail
 Great reed warbler
 Lesser swamp warbler
 Little bittern
 Little grebe
 Little rush warbler
 Rallidae
 Sedge warbler
 Spotted crake
 Western swamphen

Mammals 

 Water mongoose

See also 

 List of protected areas of South Africa

References 

Nature reserves in South Africa
Protected areas of South Africa